Shri Richpal Singh Mirdha (श्री रिछपाल सिंह मिर्धा) is a senior Indian National Congress and Popular farmer's leader in Rajasthan and a member of the Mirdha political dynasty.

Political career
Shri Mirdha started his Political career during Rajasthan Assembly election-1990, When Baba shri Nathuram Mirdha asked Richpal Mirdha to join active politics and raise farmer's issues in assembly and fight for their rights. He was elected as 1st time MLA from Degana seat of Nagaur in 1990.

Richpal Singh Mirdha's major victory was in the 1998 assembly election. When Congress did not offer him a place on the ballot, the farmers and public of Marwar took action and made history by electing him as an independent MLA from Degana by a margin of 8810 votes. This was the highest victory by any independent MLA in The 11th Rajasthan Legislative Assembly.

Later Shri Richpal Singh Mirdha Joined his original party Indian National Congress in 2003 and Won the Degana assembly seat with huge margin of 11128 votes by defeating Shri Dilip Singh of BJP. In Assembly election of 2003, he was the only congressman to win in Nagaur district.

He represented the Degana constituency in the Rajasthan Legislative Assembly from 1990 to 2008, serving four consecutive terms: Which is a record in Nagaur district to win an assembly seat continuous four times in a row:
MLA – 1990 (Janta Dal),
MLA – 1993 (Indian National Congress),
MLA – 1998 (Independent),
MLA – 2003 (Indian National Congress)
He lost his seat in 2008 by a low margin of 1174 votes to Shri Ajay singh Kilak of BJP.

Mirdha Family
The Mirdha family is a political dynasty from Rajasthan in India, the family is strongly rooted in agriculture, but also maintains a strong political presence. The family has produced leaders of national and state stature, giving it a strong socio-political standing. Some Mirdha family members of note are:
Baldev Ram Mirdha
Nathuram Mirdha
Ram Niwas Mirdha
Richpal Singh Mirdha, Nephew of Nathuram Mirdha
Harendra Mirdha, son of Ram Niwas Mirdha
Jyoti Mirdha
Vijay Pal Mirdha, MLA Degana (Son of Richpal Singh Mirdha)

References

Rajasthan MLAs 1990–1992
Year of birth missing (living people)
People from Nagaur
Living people
Rajasthan MLAs 1993–1998
Rajasthan MLAs 1998–2003
Rajasthan MLAs 2003–2008
Richpal Singh
Indian National Congress politicians